Deficit hawk is a political slang term in the English speaking world for people who place great emphasis on keeping government budgets under control. 'Hawk' can be used to describe someone calling for harsh or pain-inducing measures (alluding to the predatory nature of hawks in the natural world) in many political contexts; in the specific context of deficit reduction, the term is more commonly applied to those advocating for cuts in government spending than to those supporting increases in taxes.

Economist and opinion writer Paul Krugman has popularized the use of "deficit scold" in place of deficit hawk. According to Krugman, a columnist of The New York Times, "the Peter G. Peterson Foundation is deficit-scold central; Peterson funding lies behind much of the movement." Deficit hawks often warn that unsustainable fiscal policies could lead to investors losing confidence in U.S. government bonds, which would in turn force an increase in interest rates. Krugman has dismissed this concern by saying that there is no evidence that these "bond vigilantes" will appear anytime soon.

The Concord Coalition is another influential political advocacy group dedicated to promoting a balanced budget in the United States. The Coalition is generally perceived as bipartisan.

Critics of deficit hawks have argued that hawks stoke fears about the deficit in order to dismantle the social safety net. William Greider claims, "Their real intent is to stymie the very spending programs that can deliver economic recovery and relief to battered citizens." Greider points to the example of World War II spending during the Great Depression, in which the government ran up massive deficits but set up America's postwar prosperity. And Dean Baker,  co-director of the Center for Economic and Policy Research (CEPR), suggests a duplicity in their motives as well:

The political power of deficit hawks has waned considerably since the COVID-19 pandemic, which resulted in widespread deficit spending by many governments around the world in order to combat the economic downturn caused by the pandemic.

See also
Balanced budget
Balanced budget amendment
Balance of payments
Citizens Against Government Waste
Clintonomics
Concord Coalition
Fiscal conservatism
Fiscal council
Fiscal policy
Fiscal responsibility
PAYGO
United States federal budget

References

Political terminology of the United States
Government budgets